John Pettiford (29 November 1919 – 11 October 1964) was an Australian cricketer. He was educated at North Sydney Boys High School He played more than 200 first-class matches, mostly for New South Wales and Kent County Cricket Club. In the 1949 and 1950 seasons he was the professional for Nelson Cricket Club in the Lancashire League. He was professional for Darwen Cricket Club in the Northern Cricket League in seasons 1960 and 1961.

He served in the Royal Australian Air Force in World War II. He was a member of the Australian Services cricket team at the end of the war.

References

1919 births
1964 deaths
Australian cricketers
Royal Australian Air Force personnel of World War II
Australian Services cricketers
New South Wales cricketers
Kent cricketers
Cricketers from Sydney
Australian expatriate cricketers in the United Kingdom
North v South cricketers
Royal Australian Air Force officers
People educated at North Sydney Boys High School
Dominions cricketers